Amir Nizam-ud-din Khalifa, also Known as Mir Khalifa was a Mughal noble and statesman, who served as the Vakil of the Mughal Empire (prime minister) during the reign of Emperor Babur and Humayun.

Biography
Mir Khalifa was one of the closet companions of Babur. In 1526 Babur established Mughal Empire after defeating Ibrahim Lodhi in the Battle of Panipat. Emperor Babur created the ministry of Vakalat (Emperor's representative) and made Mir Khalifa the first Vakil of the Mughal Empire.

Mir Khalifa along with his son Mir Mohib Ali commanded the battalions of Mughal army in both battles of Panipat and Khanwa. His son fought bravely in the battle of Khanwa and impressed the Emperor. Due to Mohib's bravery Babur made him vizier in the imperial court. 

Mir Khalifa initially opposed Humayun's succession to the Mughal Throne after death of Babur because he was dread and suspicion to the young prince Humayun. He was in favour of succession of Mahdi Khawaja who was son-in-law of late Emperor.

He thought that Mahdi Khawja was a generous and liberal man but after
knowing great ambitions of Khawaja and opposition from Mughal nobles, he changed his mind and raised prince Humayun to Mughal throne and remained as the Vakil of the empire.

References

Mughal nobility
Mughal generals